Music from "The Elder" is the ninth studio album released by American rock band Kiss on the Casablanca Records label in 1981. The album marked a substantial departure from their previous output with the concept and orchestral elements. Music from "The Elder" was the first album with the drummer Eric Carr and the last album to feature guitarist Ace Frehley until their 1996 reunion.

Due to poor sales, Kiss did not embark on a supporting tour for the first time in its eight-year history, opting instead to make a handful of promotional appearances.

While the single "A World Without Heroes" was later performed on the band's 1995 MTV Unplugged appearance, Kiss has largely avoided live performances of songs from the album following initial promotional appearances in 1981. Critical reception for the album was relatively kind on release, but the album proved to be a commercial failure and was for a long time largely unpopular with the involved parties, label and musicians alike, as well as critics, even considering it to be one of the worst albums ever made. Nevertheless, it has garnered some positive reappraisal in recent years, with some critics admitting the record had its issues, but that it was still a concept album worthy of note.

Background
Kiss was in the midst of a transitional phase as the 1980s began. Drummer Peter Criss was not involved in the recording of 1980's Unmasked and he officially left Kiss in May of the same year. His replacement Eric Carr was officially introduced in July. The group had recently embarked on a hugely successful tour of Australia and New Zealand - where the group's popularity was at its peak - in November, but the band's commercial fortunes at home were drastically reduced from the 1975–79 era. Due to the lackluster sales of Unmasked, Kiss toured exclusively outside the US for the first time in their career, except for one concert at the Palladium Theatre in New York City. The overseas tours were well attended, partly because Kiss had rarely ventured abroad and because the more pop-oriented Dynasty and Unmasked albums did better in the European markets than their earlier hard rock albums.

This commercial downturn in the US is attributable to many factors; two of the biggest being the softening of Kiss' image in an effort to appeal to a broader fanbase and the softening of their music. Unmasked was a decidedly more pop-oriented effort than earlier albums, and represented a sales drop-off of 65% from 1979's Dynasty. It also became the first Kiss album to fail to achieve platinum status since 1975's Dressed to Kill. The glut of Kiss merchandising that had cropped up in the late 1970s led to a backlash from many fans who felt that Kiss was more concerned with making money than with making good music.

Composition and recording
In an effort to return to their hard rock roots, Kiss began recording music more akin to the hard rock style that launched them to popularity in the mid-1970s. The fall 1980 issue of the Kiss Army Newsletter hinted at the style the new album was to take: "It will be hard and heavy from start to finish, straight-on rock and roll that will knock your socks off." Early titles proposed for the album were "Disguise the Limit", "All American Guise", "Ear Openers", "In the Flesh", and "Higher Ground" according to a Casablanca Records memo.

At the same time, Gene Simmons, Paul Stanley, and creative manager Bill Aucoin felt that just returning to a harder sound was not enough. They believed that only a bold, artistic statement would regenerate public interest in Kiss. To that end, they enlisted producer Bob Ezrin to work with the group. Ezrin had worked with the group before, producing the group's hit 1976 album Destroyer. He had also co-produced Pink Floyd's  1979 concept album The Wall. Simmons, Stanley, and Aucoin felt that Ezrin could help bring their ambitions to fruition. The band and the producer decided to develop a full concept album from a fantasy short story conceived by Simmons, imagining it as a soundtrack for a blockbuster movie. According to Simmons, a movie deal was actually in the works and casting had begun, but the film ended up in development hell.

Recording sessions for the album commenced in March 1981 at Ace Frehley's home recording studio in Wilton, Connecticut and went on at Ezrin's farmstead near Toronto, Canada. During the recording, Ezrin and Kiss worked in complete secrecy and no one other than them ever heard the album in progress. Ezrin, in particular, had insisted that he would only communicate with Kiss or Aucoin. Members from the American Symphony Orchestra and St. Robert's Choir arranged by Michael Kamen were employed to add an orchestral sound to the tracks.

Frehley did not accompany the band to the Canadian recording sessions and became increasingly frustrated, as he disagreed with the group's decision to abandon their original plan to record a straight rock album. Additionally, a number of guitar solos he recorded were not included in the final cut. Frehley resented what he felt was Simmons' and Stanley's domination of the recording sessions and was often outvoted 2–1 on band decisions after Criss' departure, as Carr was not a partner in Kiss as the other three members were, but rather an employee. This was the last album to feature Frehley until their 1996 reunion Alive/Worldwide Tour, apart from appearing on the cover of the compilation album Killers and the next album Creatures of the Night and a handful of promotional appearances with the band until late 1982.

Story
The basic plot of "The Elder" involves the recruitment and training of a young hero (The Boy) by the Council of Elders who belong to the Order of the Rose, a mysterious group dedicated to combating evil. The Boy is guided by an elderly caretaker named Morpheus. The album's lyrics describe the boy's feelings during his journey and training, as he overcomes his early doubts to become confident and self-assured. The only spoken dialogue is at the end of the last track, "I". During the passage, Morpheus proclaims to the Elders that The Boy is ready to undertake his odyssey. "The Elder are a life-form without body", Simmons explained, "they are benevolent, but committed to the balance of opposites. And when darkness gets too strong, a hero is born to restore the balance." A number of narrative passages were cut from the final version of the album. These passages were meant to provide details of the story, and to act as transitional elements between songs.

Songs
"The Oath"
A heavy metal track written by Ezrin, Stanley and actor/songwriter Tony Powers that opened the original version of the album, many parts of the song also feature Stanley singing in falsetto, a vocal technique he utilized on several of the album's tracks. Stanley played lead and rhythm guitars, while Frehley played bass.

"Dark Light"
"Dark Light", written by Frehley with Anton Fig, Simmons and Lou Reed, was based on a guitar riff composed by Fig. When it was originally recorded as a pre-Music from "The Elder" demo, the title was "Don't Run". It is the only song Frehley sings on the album.

"A World Without Heroes"
The lone American single from the album was originally a Stanley song entitled "Every Little Bit of Your Heart". The name was changed when it was decided to record Music from "The Elder" as a concept album. Lou Reed wrote the lyric "a world without heroes is like a world without sun". Simmons and Ezrin are also credited for the song." The video for the song (from Gowers, Fields, Flattery) was the first Kiss video played by MTV. "A World Without Heroes" and "I" are the only songs on the album where Frehley does not play. The song was covered by Cher on her album Love Hurts and by the heavy metal band Witherscape on the EP The New Tomorrow.

"Escape from the Island"
An instrumental track written and performed by Frehley, Carr and Ezrin. Frehley recounted the recording of this song in a 2016 interview with The Pods & Sods Network.

Songs that were demoed but did not end up on the album include "Deadly Weapon" (Simmons recycled the title for a different song on the Asylum album), "Nowhere to Run" (re-recorded for Killers), "Feel Like Heaven" (covered by Peter Criss on Let Me Rock You), "Heaven" (became "Breakout" on Frehley's Comet's first album and "Carr Jam 81" on Revenge), "It's My Life" (covered by Wendy O. Williams and later on The Box Set) and a few instrumentals known only by their bootleg names "Kix Are for Kids", "The Difference Between Men and Boys" and "Council of the Elder". The original demos for "Deadly Weapon", "Feel Like Heaven" and "Nowhere to Run" were included on the 2022 deluxe re-release of the Creatures of the Night album.

Artwork
The original vinyl release was a gatefold sleeve. This was the first Kiss album to feature no image of the group, not even the customary front-cover appearance. According to one story, the hand reaching for the door knocker is not that of Stanley: Aucoin has stated that it belongs to a hand model, hired for the shoot; however, in 2011 a photo surfaced from the album cover shoot showing a partially naked-faced Stanley with his hand on the door knocker. The door itself was long rumored to be located at the Park Ave United Methodist Church on Park Avenue, New York City, but was actually a prop created for the shoot. The photo session displayed a change of image: the costumes were more streamlined, especially when compared with the costumes for Unmasked, as were the hairstyles of Stanley and Simmons in particular.

Release and promotion
The version of Music from "The Elder" released in the US, Europe and Brazil contained a different song order than the one originally intended. This order was chosen in order to emphasize "The Oath" and "A World Without Heroes" as potential singles, as the two songs started each side of the record. One effect of this alteration in song order was to disrupt the narrative flow of the album's story."When the album came out we were embarrassed", said Simmons.

The Japanese pressing of the album contained the intended song sequence, although "Escape from the Island" was excluded from the release and instead included as the B-side of "The Oath" single. This sequence was used (with the inclusion of "Escape from the Island") when Music from "The Elder" was re-released on CD in 1997. In a 2021 interview, band consultant Robert V. Conte discussed how the original sequence was restored. "When it came time to remaster The Elder, I contacted Gene asking for his thoughts about using that version for the CD," Conte recalls. "He was all for it but one track, 'Escape from the Island' was not on the imported version. Ay, caramba! We could not find any production notes in the PolyGram files about where it belonged on that particular sequence so, with The Demon's blessing, the track was added, the original sequence was restored, and the 1997 CD and cassette became the most complete versions of The Elder to date!"

Although budgets were prepared for a tour, none was undertaken. The only public appearances the band made in conjunction with the album were a January 15, 1982, appearance on the late-night variety show Fridays, where they performed "A World Without Heroes", "I" and "The Oath", Solid Gold ("A World Without Heroes" and "I"), and a January 28 lip synched performance of "I" from Studio 54, broadcast via satellite to the Sanremo Festival in Italy. Frehley was absent for the Studio 54 appearance, so the group performed as a trio.

Reception

When Kiss premiered Music from "The Elder" for their management and record company in October 1981, the reaction was a mixture of confusion and resentment. Business manager Howard Marks refused to allow his company's name to appear in the liner notes. Fan reaction was equally harsh, while critical reaction was comparatively positive. "A surprisingly good attempt by Kiss to edge forward…" wrote Fred Dellar in Hi-Fi News & Record Review. "The mix of familiar HM riffs and well-honed harmony vocals sometimes throw up images of Queen. Which is not at all a bad thing."

But while reviews like the one printed by Rolling Stone were kinder than past judgements, the album disappeared from the US chart by February 1982. Q magazine ranked Music From "The Elder" 44th in their list of The 50 Worst Albums Ever. The same magazine ranked the album 6th in their list of 15 Albums Where Great Rock Acts Lost the Plot.

Most participants in the album subsequently said that it was a major misstep. Ezrin, despite his recent success with the even more ambitious The Wall, admitted that his judgments concerning Music from "The Elder" were clouded due in large part to a cocaine addiction at the time. Stanley and Simmons admit that they were "delusional" concerning the project, while Frehley stated that he felt that it was not a good idea to begin with.

Accolades
Despite the general negative feelings towards this album, it has garnered some occasional praise in recent years. In 2011, Spanish authors Alberto Díaz and Xavi Martínez included it in their book Concept albums: 150 essential releases. Also in 2011, the American website Guitar World mentioned the album among their 50 Great Albums Celebrating Their 30th Anniversary in 2011 while the Brazilian magazine Roadie Crew did likewise in a list of The 81 Greatest Albums of 1981. Roadie Crew would later, in 2017, rank it among their greatest 40 concept albums ever, at #22. In 2016, Classic Rock ranked the album among a list of The 20 Most Underrated Classic Rock Albums Ever, calling the album "anomalous" but stating that it "nonetheless has much to recommend it". In 2018, the French edition of the Rock Hard magazine included it in the Volume 2 of its "ideal metaltheque", in the concept albums category.

Track listing
All credits adapted from the original releases.

1997 Remastered Version

Personnel
Kiss
Paul Stanley – vocals, rhythm guitar, all guitars on "The Oath", guitar solo on "Just a Boy" and "A World Without Heroes"
Gene Simmons – vocals, bass, rhythm guitar on "Only You"
Ace Frehley – vocals, lead guitar, bass on "Under the Rose", "Dark Light" and "The Oath"
Eric Carr – drums, percussion, acoustic guitar on "Under the Rose", backing vocals

Additional musicians
Bob Ezrin – producer, keyboards, bass on "Escape from the Island", orchestral arrangements
Allan Schwartzberg – drums on "Odyssey" and "I", additional overdub
Tony Powers – keyboards on "Odyssey"
The American Symphony Orchestra
St. Robert's Choir
Michael Kamen – orchestral arrangements

Production
Brian Christian – associate producer, engineer 
Rick Hart, Robert Hrycyna, David Brown – engineers
Rob Freeman, Corky Stasiak, Kevin Doyle – additional engineering
Tom Laughlin – chief technician
Ted Jensen – mastering engineer at Sterling Sound, New York

Charts

Album

Singles

Releases
Casablanca NBLP-7261 (November 16, 1981): LP
Casablanca NBL5-7261 (November 16, 1981): US Cassette
Casablanca NBL8-7261 (November 16, 1981): US 8-track
PolyGram 824-153-2 (May 23, 1989): 1st US CD release
Mercury 314 532 390-2 (October 7, 1997): Remastered CD

Notes and references

External links

1981 albums
Albums produced by Bob Ezrin
Albums recorded in a home studio
Art rock albums by American artists
Casablanca Records albums
Concept albums
Kiss (band) albums
Progressive rock albums by American artists
Rock operas